The Møbelringen Cup 2005 was held in Bodø, Steinkjer and Trondheim, Norway. The tournament started on 24 November 2005 and finished on 27 November. Denmark won the event on goal difference ahead of Russia.

Results

All times are Central European Time (UTC+1)

References

2005 in handball
2005
2005 in Norwegian sport